The Ruleton School, in Sherman County, Kansas near Goodland, is a historic school that was built in 1928.  It includes Modern Movement architecture and is listed on the National Register of Historic Places.

It was deemed historically significant for its usage as a school and as a community center in its community of Ruleton.  It was built after a bond vote to raise $22,500 was passed by vote of 44 to 26, on March 17, 1928.

References 

School buildings on the National Register of Historic Places in Kansas
School buildings completed in 1928
Buildings and structures in Sherman County, Kansas
Schools in Kansas
National Register of Historic Places in Sherman County, Kansas
Modern Movement architecture in the United States
Unused buildings in Kansas
1928 establishments in Kansas